The Unwritten Code is a 1919 American silent drama film directed by Bernard J. Durning and starring Shirley Mason, Ormi Hawley, and Matt Moore. The art director Cedric Gibbons designed the film's sets, while William A. Wellman worked as an assistant director.

Main cast

Production
The film had several working titles including Aliens, Weaver of Dreams, and The Wall Invisible.

References

Bibliography
 Robert B. Connelly. The Silents: Silent Feature Films, 1910-36, Volume 40, Issue 2. December Press, 1998.

External links

 
 

1919 films
1919 drama films
1910s English-language films
American silent feature films
Silent American drama films
American black-and-white films
Films directed by Bernard Durning
World Film Company films
1910s American films